Front ohne Gnade is an East German television series.

See also
List of German television series

External links
 

1984 German television series debuts
1984 German television series endings
World War II television series
Espionage television series
German-language television shows
Television in East Germany